8 Squadron or 8th Squadron may refer to:
 No. 8 Squadron PAF, a unit of the Pakistan Air Force
 No. 8 Squadron RAF, a unit of the Royal Air Force
 No. 8 Squadron RAAF, a unit of the Royal Australian Air Force
 No. 8 Squadron RNZAF, a unit of the Royal New Zealand Air Force
 8 Squadron SAAF, a unit of the South African Air Force, disbanded in 2001
 8th Tactical Fighter Squadron (JASDF), a unit of the Japan Air Self-Defense Force
 8th Fighter Squadron, a unit of the United States Air Force
 8th Flying Training Squadron, a unit of the United States Air Force
 8th Special Operations Squadron, a unit of the United States Air Force
 8th Weapons Squadron, a unit of the United States Air Force
 8th Airlift Squadron, a unit of the United States Air Force
 HSC-8 (Helicopter Sea Combat Squadron 8), a unit of the United States Navy
 HS-8 (Helicopter Antisubmarine Squadron 8), a unit of the United States Navy
 HT-8 (Helicopter Training Squadron 8), a unit of the United States Navy
 VT-8 (Torpedo Squadron 8), a unit of the United States Navy